The Elections Act 2001 (c.7) was an Act of the Parliament of the United Kingdom. Because of the 2001 United Kingdom foot-and-mouth crisis the Act postponed the 2001 local government elections in England and Wales, from 3 May 2001 to 7 June 2001, and in Northern Ireland, from 16 May 2001 to 7 June 2001. In Northern Ireland, it also required polls to be taken together on the day. In England, Wales and Northern Ireland it also increased candidates expenses by 50%.

It also defines the rules for taking both the parliamentary and local elections at the same time in Northern Ireland, amending Representation of the People Act 1985.

References

United Kingdom Acts of Parliament 2001
Election law in the United Kingdom
Election legislation